The New Zealand College of Clinical Psychologists (NZCCP) is a professional associations for clinical psychologists in New Zealand.

History

The college was established in August 1989, breaking away from the New Zealand Psychological Society. The College formed in order to promote and coordinate for the profession of Clinical Psychology. By 2004, the college had grown to 450 members.

Ethics

Members of the society are signatories to the Code of Ethics for Psychologists Working in Aotearoa/New Zealand, which was established in 2002 due to the Health Practitioners Competence Assurance Act 2003. Prior to the establishment of the code, each individual professional association for psychologists in New Zealand had their own code of ethics.

Presidents

Past presidents of the New Zealand College of Clinical Psychologists include Olina Carter, John Dugdale, John Bushnell, Nigel Fairley, and Malcolm Stewart

Publications
Journal of the New Zealand College of Clinical Psychologists

References

External links
 Official website

1989 establishments in New Zealand
Clinical psychology
Mental health organisations in New Zealand
Organizations established in 1989
Professional associations based in New Zealand
Psychological societies
Psychology-related professional associations
Psychology organisations based in New Zealand